Qyoto is a Japanese pop band under the Ariola Japan label. The band name comes from spelling Kyoto. Their main producer is Daiko Nagato from recording company Being Inc.

History
The first formation of band started in 2016 with the vocalist Yuuki and Hiroki. In March 2017, Tsuchiya joined to the band and complete in May Kensuke and Ryota joined, which makes 6-piece member band.

In August 2017, they've made major debut with single Taiyou mo Hitori Bocchi, in the media it was promoted as an opening theme for anime television series Dive!!. On-air version was broadcast on television on 6 July. The single reached #75 in Oricon Weekly Rankings and charted for two weeks.

In April 2018, Yuuki made guest appearance in the third episode of japanese television drama Hannari Girori no Yoriko-san.

In June 2018, they've appeared on free live Kansai Neo Rock along with bands as Dps, Cross Lord and Satou Cocoa to Hinawa Juu, who all of the artists belongs to Being Inc's indies label.

In July 2018, after eleven months they've released second single It's all in the game, in the media it was promoted as an opening theme for anime television series Boruto: Naruto Next Generations. The single reached #75 in Oricon Weekly Rankings and charted for two weeks.

In December 2018, they've released third single Mafuyu no Diary. The B-side song I'm Looser has been in media promoted as an opening theme for television program Kuchi Dome Kyuushi. The single reached #52 in Oricon Weekly Rankings and charted for three weeks.

In January 2019, their song Kimi ni Koi wo, Kokoro ni Natsu wo served as a theme song for television program Kyoto Koi Kentei. 

In March 2019, they appeared on live celebration of live house Pan Koujou Hills 16th anniversary.

On 12 June, was announced their new song Kimi ni Tsutaeta Story, which will serve as an ending theme song for anime television series Mix. The single released on 31 July. B-side tracks includes Kimi ni Koi wo, Kokoro ni Natsu wo and cover version of Touch originally performed by Yoshimi Iwasaki.

On 25 August, they'll make stage appearance on free-live event DFT presents Onto: Neorock from Kansai along with Dps and Sard Underground.

On 25 September, they'll released fifth single Hana Shigure/Natsu no Yuki. Hana Shigure serves as an ending theme song for Japanese television drama Jikū Tantei oyū ōedo Kagaku Sōsa.  B-side tracks Natsu no Yuki serves as an ending theme and Boku no Ikiteiru Imi as an insert theme song for japanese television drama Namonaki Fukushū-sha Zegen.

Members
  - vocals, lyricist
 Hiroki - violinist, lyricist, composer
 Tsuchiya - guitarist
 Takuya - bassist
 Kensuke - drummer
 Ryota - keyboard, saxophone

Discography

Singles

Interview
From Popscene.jp:
It's all in the game
Mayufu no Diary

From Natalie.mu:
Taiyou mo Hitori Bocchi
It's all in the game
Mafuyu no Diary

References

External links
Qyoto official Web site 
Qyoto Official YouTube channel 
 	

Being Inc. artists
Living people
Japanese pop music groups
Anime musicians
Musical groups established in 2016
2016 establishments in Japan
Year of birth missing (living people)